She's Strange is the tenth album by the funk band Cameo, released in 1984. It reached number 1 on the Billboard R&B Albums chart, number 27 on the Billboard Pop Albums chart, and was certified Gold by the RIAA for sales of over 500,000 copies. 

This album is dedicated to the late Polygram A&R representative, Bill Haywood; as Cameo mentions in the liner-notes of the album, "The album which he always wanted". The track "Talking Out the Side of Your Neck" is a commonly performed arrangement amongst marching bands, especially those from HBCUs. The titular track became the group's first number one single on the R&B charts, topping the charts for four weeks in April 1984.

Track listing
 "She's Strange" – 7:12 (L.Blackmon, T.Jenkins, N.Leftenant/C.Singleton)
 "Love You Anyway" – 5:01 (C.Singleton, M.Wells)
 "Talkin' Out the Side of Your Neck" – 4:04 (L.Blackmon, T.Jenkins, N.Leftenant/C.Singleton)
 "Tribute to Bob Marley" – 5:20
 "Groove With You" – 5:10
 "Hangin' Downtown" – 5:07 (K.Hairston)
 "Lé Ve Toi!" – 4:50

Personnel
Rod Antoon – keyboards
Anthony Barboza – photography
Larry Blackmon – percussion, arranger, drums, bass guitar, vocals, producer, horn arrangements, mixing
Michael Burnett – bass guitar
Glen Christensen – graphic design
Mac James – artwork
Tomi Jenkins – vocals
Steve Jerome – mixing
Kevin Kendrick – synthesizer, keyboards
Nathan Leftenant – backing vocals, horn arrangements
Bill Levy – art direction
Wesley Phillips – trumpet
Alan "Funt" Prater – trombone
Tom Race – engineer, mixing
Charlie Singleton – synthesizer, guitar, percussion, arranger, keyboards, vocals
Jack Skinner – mastering
Melvin Wells – bass guitar, alto saxophone, backing vocals, horn arrangements

Chart positions
The Billboard 200 – #27 
Top R&B/Hip-Hop Albums – #1

Singles
"She's Strange" – released: December 11, 1983
"Talkin’ Out The Side Of Your Neck"
"Hangin’ Downtown"

Later samples
"She's Strange"
"Young Niggaz" by 2Pac from the album Me Against the World
"She's Strange" by Nate Dogg from the album "G-Funk Classics, Vol. 1 & 2"
"We Want Yo Hands Up" by Mr. Malik featuring Warren G & Hershey Locc
"The Party Continues" by Jermaine Dupri featuring Da Brat & Usher from the album "Life in 1472"
"Kill 'em with the Shoulders" by Snoop Dogg featuring Lil Duval

References

Cameo (band) albums
1984 albums